Navy diver is a general term to describe members of a country's naval forces who specialize in underwater diving and military diving.

 Australia: Royal Australian Navy clearance diver
 Canada: Canadian clearance diver
 Germany: German Navy clearance diver
 Ireland: Naval Service Diving Section (NSDS)
 Norway: Norwegian Navy mine diver command
 United Kingdom: Royal Navy ships diver
 United States: Navy diver (United States Navy)

Armed forces diving